
Luru Mayu Lake (Quechua luru pip, mayu river, "pip river", hispanicized spelling Loromayu) is a lake in Bolivia located in the Potosí Department, Sud Lípez Province, San Pablo de Lípez Municipality. At an elevation of 4,666 m, its surface area is 12 km². It lies in the Eduardo Avaroa Andean Fauna National Reserve, northwest of a mountain called Luru Mayu. The lake is named after a river which originates in the mountains south and southeast of the lake.

References 

Lakes of Potosí Department